Makarije Sokolović (died 1574) was the Archbishop of Peć and Serbian Patriarch from 1557 to 1571. He was the first head of the restored Serbian Patriarchate of Peć, after its lapse in 1463 that resulted from the Ottoman conquest of Serbia. He is variously reported to have been the brother, nephew, or first cousin of the Ottoman Grand Vizier Mehmed-paša Sokolović, who used his influence in the Ottoman Empire to reestablish the Serbian Patriarchate with its seat in Monastery of Peć. Patriarch Makarije is celebrated as a saint in the Serbian Orthodox Church.

Biography
He was born in the 16th century, his family hailing from the Serb clan of Piva in Old Herzegovina. He was a close kinsman of Mehmed-paša Sokolović, the Ottoman Grand Vizier.

Prior to the re-establishment of the Patriarchate, the Serbs were under the jurisdiction of the Archbishopric of Ohrid. Metropolitan of Smederevo Pavle was one of many that did not recognize the current status of Serb Orthodox in the Ottoman Empire and sought to make the Serbian Church independent once again. Makarije became the first Patriarch of the renewed Serbian Patriarchate of Peć in 1557. The Ottoman Sultan gave Makarije the same rights as the Patriarch of Constantinople.

The jurisdiction of the Patriarchate was the land of the medieval Serbian state, with Bačka, Banat, Baranja, Srem, Slavonia, Bosanska Krajina, Bosna, Lika, Krbava and Dalmatia, and had more than 40 eparchies, with the newly founded Eparchy of Trebinje, Eparchy of Požega, etc.

Among renewed monasteries were Banja Monastery in Priboj, Gračanica, Studenica, the Patriarchal Monastery of Peć, and Budisavci in Kosovo and Metohia. This renewal started a renaissance of the Serb culture in arts and literature.

Because of illness, he was succeeded in 1571, by his fraternal nephew Antonije Sokolović. He died in 1574.

Legacy
He is included in The 100 most prominent Serbs.

References

Sources

External links
 Official site of the Serbian Orthodox Church: Serbian Archbishops and Patriarchs

16th-century Serbian people
Serbian saints of the Eastern Orthodox Church
16th-century Eastern Orthodox bishops
Makarije I
16th century in Serbia
Serbs of Bosnia and Herzegovina
People from Višegrad
Year of birth unknown
1574 deaths
Ottoman period in the history of Bosnia and Herzegovina
Ottoman Serbia
16th-century people from the Ottoman Empire